Cheongju Dongbang clan was one of the Korean clans. Their Bon-gwan was in Cheongju, North Chungcheong Province. According to the research in 2000, the number of Cheongju Dongbang clan was 119. Dongbang clan was born in Jinan, China. Fuxi made surname East because he was a citizen of zhèn, but it is not clear that how Cheongju Dongbang clan were established in Korea and their founder has been still unknown.

See also 
 Korean clan names of foreign origin

References

External links 
 

 
Korean clan names of Chinese origin